"Handful of Promises" is a pop-dance song written by Stock Aitken Waterman for British boys band Big Fun. It was the third single from their 1990 debut studio album A Pocketful of Dreams on which it is the first track. The B-side of the various formats is a new song, "Catch a Broken Heart", which was not included on the parent album. Released on 5 March 1990 with two different covers, it failed to reach the top 20 in United Kingdom where it stalled at number 21. However, it was a top ten hit in Ireland and Spain.

Chart performance
"Handful of Promises" entered the UK Singles Chart at number 29 on 17 March 1990, climbed the following week to reach a peak of number 21, and charted for a total of six weeks. In Ireland, it ranked for three weeks from 15 March 1990, with a peak at number six, which is the Big Fun single's highest placement in the country. It was also a top 14 hit in Finland and was a hit in Spain where it reached number 9. It achieved a moderate success in Belgium (Flanders) where it was a top 50 hit, and missed the top 100 in Australia where it peaked at number 110. On the Eurochart Hot 100, it started at number 71 on 24 March 1990, peaked of number 53 in its second and third weeks and fell off the top 100 after four weeks.

Formats and track listings
 7" single, Cassette
 "Handful of Promises" – 3:16
 "Catch a Broken Heart" – 3:39

 CD maxi
 "Handful of Promises" (7" version) – 3:17
 "Handful of Promises" (12" version) – 6:38
 "Catch a Broken Heart" – 3:48
 "Can't Shake the Feeling" – 3:39

 12" single
 "Handful of Promises" (12" version) – 6:38
 "Handful of Promises" (instrumental) – 3:48
 "Catch a Broken Heart" – 3:39

Credits and personnel
The following people contributed to "Handful of Promises":
Karen Hewitt - Engineer 
Phil Harding - Mixing

Charts

References

1989 songs
1990 singles
Big Fun (band) songs
Song recordings produced by Stock Aitken Waterman
Songs written by Mike Stock (musician)
Songs written by Matt Aitken
Songs written by Pete Waterman
Jive Records singles